Coban may refer to:

Cobán, the capital of the department of Alta Verapaz in central Guatemala
Cobán Athletic, an association football club based in Jesús de Otoro, Honduras
Çoban (disambiguation), Turkish name
Self-adhering bandage, also known as Coban